Joel Kocher is an American businessman.  He worked at Dell for seven years, where he eventually became the #2 executive behind Michael Dell, President of Worldwide Marketing, Sales and Service. He developed Dell's initial commercial and government strategy and execution. He left in late 1994, and became president of Artisoft, where he initiated its transformation to a telephony software provider.

In 1996, he left Artisoft to become president of Power Computing, the first Mac clone company.  The company successfully filed an IPO in May 1997. When Apple refused to renew Power's clone license, Kocher resigned when the Board refused to sue over the issue.

In January 1998, Kocher joined MicronPC as its president. He was promoted to chairman and CEO in June 1998. The company sold off its unprofitable PC business to Gores Technology Group and subsequently merged with Interland (now Web.com).  During the Clinton Administration, Kocher was one of three industry leaders engaged to advise Vice President Gore and President Clinton on revamping GSA.
   
Kocher founded Neogenis Labs in 2010, a nutraceutical and nutritionals company based on nitric oxide research from the University of Texas Institute of Molecular Science, and which offers a line of science-based products for health and wellness. It is now known as Humann.com.

Kocher has a B.S. in marketing from the University of Florida. He attended Executive MBA curricula at Stanford Business School and Wharton Business School of Management. An avid sailor and adventurer, he took part in an Antarctic expedition. He and his wife AnnMarie are a founding family of the Trinity Episcopal School in Austin, Texas. They have five sons.

References

External links
 Talk Show, BusinessWeek, March 4, 2001

Living people
Year of birth missing (living people)